The following is a list of South Korean films released in 2019.

Box office
The highest-grossing South Korean films released in 2019, by domestic box office gross revenue, are as follows:

Released

References

External links

South Korean
2019
2019 in South Korean cinema